The Power Macintosh 4400 (sold as the Power Macintosh 7220 in some markets) is a personal computer designed, manufactured and sold by Apple Computer, Inc. from November 1996 to February 1998. It differs from prior desktop Macintosh models in that it was built with industry-standard components such as an IDE hard drive and an ATX-like power supply.

The 4400 was introduced to the market at a time when several Macintosh clones were available on the market, often at prices lower than Apple's.  The "Tanzania" logic board in the 4400 was an Apple design but had only been used in clones up to this point.  MacWEEK's review described the case as "Strange in the Apple brood; when compared with PCs it fits right in with the flock. It is contained in a stock desktop PC case fitted with Apple's distinctive curved nose piece. The back is industrial-looking, while bent sheet metal fills the case's insides, sharp edges and all. The IDE drive sits on end, while the Comm II slot (occupied with an Ethernet card) and two PCI slots reside in a riser card. For the first time, Apple has abandoned automatic switching in the power supply, a small cost savings at the expense of international users' convenience."

This was the only Power Macintosh to be designed with the goal of using low-cost manufacturing techniques; the 4400 was removed from Apple's lineup a few months after the Power Macintosh G3 Desktop went on sale, which was priced comparably to the 4400 but used Apple's Power Macintosh 7300 form factor instead.

Models 

The initial 4400/160 model was only sold to the European market.  Some of Apple's online literature referred to the machine as the "Performa 4400", owing to its entry-level position in the market, but no machine sold was labelled as such.  (The Performa brand was formally retired a few months later.)

An updated 200 MHz 603e model was released in the United States in February 1997 as the Power Macintosh 4400/200. It was also available as a "PC Compatible" system with a 166 MHz DOS card containing 16 MB of RAM and a Cyrix 6x86 processor.

The Power Macintosh 4400 was sold as the Power Macintosh 7220 in Australia and Asia, where the number 4 is considered unlucky.  

Introduced November 7, 1996:
 Power Macintosh 4400/160: Sold in Europe; no L2 cache or Ethernet.

Introduced February 17, 1997:
The 200 MHz versions support a maximum RAM capacity of 160 MB, and have an updated PCI adapter card has two PCI slots and one Comm II slot, instead of three PCI slots.
 Power Macintosh 4400/200: Sold worldwide, except the Far East.
 Power Macintosh 7220/200: Sold in Far East countries, e.g. Japan and Australia.

Introduced April 4, 1997:
 Power Macintosh 4400/200 PC Compatible: Same as the 4400/200 with the addition of the PC Compatibility card, which enables running MS-DOS and Windows 95.  
 Power Macintosh 7220/200 PC Compatible: Same as the 4400/200 PC Compatible, sold in Far East countries and Europe.

Timeline

References

External links 

 Lowendmac.com - Power Macintosh 4400
 Apple-history.com - Power Macintosh 4400 information

4400
4400
Macintosh desktops
Macintosh case designs
Computer-related introductions in 1996